David Sheinkopf (born August 15, 1970) is an American actor, best known for playing Danny Sharpe during the final (1989–1990) season of the television program Falcon Crest.

He also appeared in Quantum Leap, Party of Five, JAG and Diagnosis: Murder. As of 2006, he appears on HGTV's Design on a Dime. He also portrayed Morris Delancy in the Disney movie, Newsies.

In 2016, he provided the voice of  "Legion" OS in the game Titanfall 2.

In 2017, he voiced Dropforge in Transformers Robots in Disguise.

In 2022, he wrote a book titled "Village Idiot: A Manhattan Memoir" that chronicles his time growing up in New York's Greenwich Village in the eighties.

Publication

External links

American male television actors
Living people
1970 births